The Romsey Advertiser is a local weekly newspaper for the town of Romsey and surrounding areas, in Hampshire, England.

It was established in 1896 as part of the Andover Advertiser. It became a separate publication in 1901.

Photographs became a regular feature in the 1960s. Colour was introduced in the early 1990s. It was a broadsheet paper until 2007, when it became compact-sized.

The paper is currently published every Friday. It includes local news, sport, property, classified advertising and the 7 Days leisure section, which also appears in the Hampshire Chronicle.

Its offices are at 21a Market Place in Romsey.

Until April 1991, the Romsey Advertiser was printed at the Hampshire Chronicle offices, 57 High Street Winchester. After that it was printed at Portsmouth Printing and Publishing Ltd. It is now printed at Newsquest's Print Centre, in Test Lane, Redbridge, Southampton.

The Romsey Advertiser is owned by Newsquest, which is the second largest publisher of regional and local newspapers in the UK, and is itself part of the US group Gannett.
Sister newspapers in the area include the Hampshire Chronicle, Andover Advertiser, Southern Daily Echo and the Salisbury Journal.

References

External links
 

Newspapers published in Hampshire
Newspapers established in 1901
1901 establishments in England
Romsey